The Three Arts Club of Chicago was a Chicago home and club for women in the "three arts" of music, painting and drama. The building is on the List of Chicago Landmarks as of June 10, 1981. The club, modeled on the Three Arts Club of New York, was founded in 1912.

History

The first Three Arts Club residence, located at 1614 North LaSalle Street, had a restaurant and rooms to house sixteen women.

In 1914 the club commissioned their own building, designed by architects Holabird & Roche. The new three story building opened in 1915 at 1300 N. Dearborn Street with 92 residence rooms.

Over 13,000 women stayed in the club throughout its history.

Three Arts Club provided residential space for women artists continuously until 2004, when the last of the residents moved out. In 2007 the building was sold to developers and net proceeds were invested in an operating fund to seed and grow a new nonprofit, 3Arts. 

Today, the Three Arts Club building is owned by Restoration Hardware Chicago and has an art gallery and restaurant (Three Arts Café) at the 1300 N. Dearborn Street location. The original dormitory floor boundary lines, dining hall, and kitchen remain.

Mission 
Three Arts Club was formed to be a social center and "safe and congenial" home for women studying arts in Chicago.

References

1912 establishments in Illinois
Organizations based in Chicago
Women's clubs in the United States
History of women in Illinois
Arts organizations established in 1912
Chicago Landmarks
Women in Chicago